Eloquence (from French eloquence from Latin eloquentia) is fluent, elegant, persuasive, and forceful speech, persuading an audience. Eloquence is both a natural talent and improved by knowledge of language, study of a specific subject to be addressed, philosophy, rationale and ability to form a persuasive set of tenets within a presentation.

"True eloquence," Oliver Goldsmith says, "Does not consist ... in saying great things in a sublime style, but in a simple style; for there is, properly speaking, no such thing as a sublime style, the sublimity lies only in the things; and when they are not so, the language may be turgid, affected, metaphorical, but not affecting."

Eloquence in antiquity
The word eloquence itself derives from the Latin roots: ē (a shortened form of the preposition ex), meaning "out (of)", and loqui, a deponent verb meaning "to speak". Thus, eloquence is to speak fluently and understand and master language so as to employ a graceful style with persuasiveness, or gracefulness in interpretation and communication. 

The concept of eloquence could date back to the Rhetoric of the ancient Greeks, Calliope (one of the nine daughters of Zeus and Mnemosyne) being the Muse of epic poetry and eloquence. Hermes, the Greek God, was a patron of eloquence. Cicero, a rhetorician and prolific author, was well-regarded in Ancient Rome as an orator of excellent eloquence.

Renaissance eloquence
The Renaissance humanists focused on the correlation of speech and political principles as a powerful tool to present and persuade others to particular concepts.  At the core of presentations was the use of graceful style, clear concise grammar and usage, and over time the insertion of rational and emotional arguments.

Petrarch (Fracesco Petrarca), in his study program of the classics and antiquity (Italian Renaissance) focused attention on language and communication. After mastering language, the goal was to reach a "level of eloquence", to be able to present gracefully, combine thought and reason in a powerful way, so as to persuade others to a point of view.  Petrarch encouraged students to imitate the ancient writers, from a language perspective, combining clear and correct speech with moral thought.  

Later, Fr. Louis Bourdaloue is regarded as one of the founders of French eloquence.

Modern politicians and eloquence
Many famous political leaders, like Winston Churchill and Martin Luther King Jr. and dictators such as Adolf Hitler and Benito Mussolini rose to prominence in large part due to their eloquence. In the Iranian Revolution, Ruhollah Khomeini came to power in part through the eloquence of his speeches, smuggled into the country on audio cassettes while he was still in exile.

See also
De vulgari eloquentia an essay by Dante Alighieri
Peak of Eloquence (Nahj al-Balagha)
Public speaking for oratory and oration
Rhetoric
Conférence du barreau de Paris

References

Further reading
 Mark Forsyth (2013), The Elements of Eloquence: How to Turn the Perfect English Phrase.

External links

  Figures of Speech
 Abraham Lincoln's Lost Speech
 Modern parliamentary eloquence; the Rede lecture, delivered before the University of Cambridge, 6 November 1913 by George Curzon, 1st Marquess Curzon of Kedleston

Public speaking